The Tempe Municipal Building is an inverted pyramid-shaped building which serves as the city hall of Tempe, Arizona. It was designed by architects Rolf Osland, Michael Goodwin and Kemper Goodwin, and built during 1969–1971.

Design & Construction 
The first design Michael Goodwin proposed was a large concrete building, similar to Boston City Hall. The city council rejected his design. The next was a structure that terraced down the slope of Tempe Butte. The council also rejected this undersign. Goodwin then came up with the idea of an inverted pyramid while in the shower. He saw how light shined across the shower door at 45-degree angles, what followed was a conversation with Rolf Osland who drafted the formal design. In 1966 the Goodwin firm drew up the plans for the new municipal building. The building's inverted pyramidal shape helps in keeping the building cool in summer and warm in winter. The council chambers are in a semi-buried basement level. The building is flanked by free-standing fire stair towers. Ground was broken in 1969. The contractor selected was M. M. Sundt Construction Company of Phoenix. The building was completed in 1971 and inaugurated on October 2nd of that year.

Renovations 
In July 2019 the first phase of a decade long renovation began. The first phase includes renovation of the plaza level council chambers which haven't been updated since the late 1980s. The council chamber renovation is expected to be completed in early 2020. The second phase is a renovation to the west garden level. The other phases include renovations to the interior of the building and new heating and air conditioning equipment. The four phase renovation is expected to be completed by the end of the 2020s.

Gallery

See also

References 
 http://lcweb2.loc.gov/master/pnp/habshaer/az/az0200/az0209/data/az0209data.pdf

External links
 
 

Buildings and structures in Tempe, Arizona
Government buildings in Arizona
Inverted pyramids
Modernist architecture in Arizona
1970s architecture in the United States
Historic American Buildings Survey in Arizona
Pyramids in the United States
Government buildings completed in 1971
1971 establishments in Arizona